Amanohashidate (天橋立 ) is one of Japan's three scenic views. The sandbar is located in Miyazu Bay in northern Kyoto Prefecture. It forms part of the Tango-Amanohashidate-Ōeyama Quasi-National Park.

Location
A thin strip of land connects two opposing sides of Miyazu Bay.

It can be viewed from mountains on either side of the bay or it can be traversed on foot.  Near the northern end is Kono Shrine, Shinto Shrine and the southern end is Chion-ji, a Buddhist temple.

On the bar is the Isoshimizu fresh water well cherished since the Heian period, which was selected as one of 100 best springs and rivers in Japan by the Environmental Agency in 1985.

Access
Amanohashidate Station on the Miyazu Line railway, about two hours from Kyoto Station or Osaka Station, is located within walking distance from the southern end of Amanohashidate.

See also
List of Special Places of Scenic Beauty, Special Historic Sites and Special Natural Monuments
 The 100 Views of Nature in Kansai

References

External links

Amanohashidate Tourist Association (English page)

Special Places of Scenic Beauty
Landforms of Kyoto Prefecture
Landforms of Japan
Tourist attractions in Kyoto Prefecture
Shoals of Japan